Luke Kunin (born December 4, 1997) is an American professional ice hockey center for the San Jose Sharks of the National Hockey League (NHL). He previously played in the NHL for the Minnesota Wild and Nashville Predators. The Wild selected him in the first round, 15th overall, in the 2016 NHL Entry Draft.

Born in Chesterfield, Missouri, Kunin had a number of NHL players for coaches during his minor ice hockey career, including Keith Tkachuk, whose son Matthew he played alongside as a child. Kunin spent one year at the Whitfield School before joining the USA Hockey National Team Development Program, with whom he played in the World U-17 Hockey Challenge and the IIHF World U18 Championship. He finished high school early to begin playing college ice hockey with the Wisconsin Badgers. There, Kunin became the first sophomore to captain the Badgers in over 40 years, while also captaining the United States team at the IIHF World Junior Championship.

After two years with Wisconsin, Kunin signed a contract with the Wild. He spent the  jumping between Minnesota and the Iowa Wild of the American Hockey League (AHL), in part due to NHL salary cap difficulties, but was supposed to finish out the year in Minnesota if not for an anterior cruciate ligament injury in March 2018. After a slow start to the year, he finished on a scoring streak, including a double-overtime victory over the Carolina Hurricanes in the 2021 Stanley Cup playoffs.

Early life
Kunin was born on December 4, 1997, in Chesterfield, Missouri, to Mark and Sheri Kunin. He began playing minor ice hockey for a youth affiliate of the St. Louis Blues, and was coached by former professional hockey players like Keith Tkachuk, Jeff Brown, Al MacInnis, and Jamie Rivers. He spent one year attending the Whitfield School and playing for the Warriors hockey team before USA Hockey National Team Development Program (NTDP) in Ann Arbor, Michigan. Kunin played in the NTDP for two seasons, and in his second year with the team, he scored 27 goals and 42 points in 61 games. Kunin, Matthew Tkachuk, and Clayton Keller all played together in the 2010 Quebec International Pee-Wee Hockey Tournament with their St. Louis minor hockey team. Kunin finished high school in only three years so that he could continue his hockey career at the age of 17.

When he was in sixth grade, Kunin was diagnosed with type 1 diabetes, and in addition to finding ways to manage his condition on the ice, he found an inspiration in professional hockey player and fellow diabetic B. J. Crombeen of the Blues. Kunin also leaned on his older brother Nick, whose own hockey career was cut short by a series of concussions, for support as he became accustomed to managing his condition.

Playing career

NCAA
On May 24, 2013, Kunin committed to play college ice hockey for the Wisconsin Badgers, starting in the 2015–16 season. As he had finished high school early, Kunin entered the program as the youngest skater on the team, but he impressed coach Mike Eaves with his maturity, skating skill, and shooting abilities. Although Wisconsin finished last in the Big Ten Conference that year with an 8–19–8 record, Kunin led the team with 18 goals and 33 points. He said afterwards that he believed he developed his skills significantly that season, particularly his 200-foot game, by playing regularly against older students at the collegiate level. At the end of the year, he was the only member of the Badgers named to the 2016 All-Big Ten Freshmen Team. After the season, the Minnesota Wild of the National Hockey League (NHL) selected Kunin in the first round, 15th overall, of the 2016 NHL Entry Draft, and he decided that he would spend one more year with the Badgers before transitioning to professional hockey.

Leading into the 2016–17 college hockey season, Kunin was named captain of the Badgers, becoming the first sophomore to earn the title since Mike Eaves during the 1975–76 season. Knowing that Kunin planned on leaving Wisconsin after the season, Badgers head coach Tony Granato spent the year preparing Kunin for the higher level of play that the NHL would require, turning him into a respectable two-way player. He received two Big Ten Second Star of the Week awards that season: first on November 1 after scoring five points in a weekend series against the St. Lawrence Saints and Clarkson Golden Knights, respectively, and later on December 13 for scoring two goals in a 7–4 win over the Michigan Wolverines. The Badgers came within one game of reaching the NCAA postseason, losing to Penn State in double overtime of the Big Ten Conference championship game. Kunin once again led all Badgers in scoring with 22 goals and 38 points, netting him an All-Big Ten Second Team placement, while Wisconsin won 12 more games that season than the last. Despite losing the Big Ten tournament, Kunin was still named to the 2017 Big Ten All-Tournament Team at forward, the only Badger selected. The American Hockey Coaches Association also named Kunin a Division I Second Team All-American for the West Region.

Professional

Minnesota Wild

On March 23, 2017, Kunin agreed to a three-year, entry-level contract with the Wild. He played in 12 games for Iowa to close out their season, putting up five goals and three assists in the process.

When a number of injuries befell the Wild roster, however, Kunin made his NHL debut on short notice, skating in less than 14 minutes of the home opener against the Columbus Blue Jackets before he was sent back down to save space on the team's salary cap. During another brief recall on October 27, Kunin became the first player in franchise history to make his debut NHL goal short-handed. Zack Mitchell also scored his first NHL goal, the game-winner, during the same match, after telling Kunin before the game, "Let's both get our first, but I'll let you go first." Still primarily an AHL player, Kunin was selected for the 2018 AHL All-Star Classic as the only representative from Iowa. Kunin was once again called up to Minnesota on February 27 in order to give the team more energy as they finished out the season, but on March 4, during a game against the Detroit Red Wings, he suffered a season-ending anterior cruciate ligament injury in his right knee. At the time, Kunin had played in 19 NHL games for the season, scoring two goals and two assists in the process. He also played in 36 AHL games, with 10 goals and 19 points there. He underwent surgery for the injury at the beginning of April, with an estimated recovery time of six to seven months.

He spent the next few months moving up and down between the NHL and AHL. His first recall was on December 9, filling in for an injured Mikko Koivu. He was meant to return to Iowa a week later, but an injury to Matt Dumba forced coach Bruce Boudreau to rearrange his offensive lines, and Kunin remained in Minnesota skating alongside Koivu and Jason Zucker. He was briefly sent back down to Iowa at the end of January to play in two AHL games while Minnesota had an eight-day break, and he was recalled to the NHL on February 4. His point production was minimal during this final stretch, with only one goal and two assists in his last 18 NHL games of the season, but Kunin was given a gradually larger role for Minnesota in the hopes that he would become a staple of their lineup the following season.

When Minnesota's season came to an end on April 9, Kunin was one of a handful of skaters sent back to Iowa to help them during their run for the Calder Cup. In his 49 games with Minnesota, Kunin scored six goals and 17 points while recording 27 penalty minutes. He also had nine goals and 16 points in 25 regular-season AHL games. Kunin appeared in 11 playoff games, scoring six goals and eight points, before the Iowa Wild were eliminated by the Chicago Wolves.

Primarily a checking line, Greenway and Eriksson Ek served as physical players tasked with preventing the opposing team from scoring, while also leaving Kunin open to score for Minnesota. By the time that the COVID-19 pandemic forced the NHL to suspend the 2019–20 season in March, Kunin had scored 15 goals and 16 assists in 63 games. The Wild had clinched a spot in the 2020 Stanley Cup playoffs, with Kunin invited to participate, but he was initially hesitant to break quarantine, as his diabetes diagnosis placed him at higher risk of suffering complications from the virus. Kunin ultimately joined the team in Edmonton for a best-of-five qualifying series against the Vancouver Canucks. Despite two goals from Kunin, the Canucks won the series in four games.

Nashville Predators
On October 7, 2020, the Wild traded Kunin and the 101st overall pick in the 2020 NHL Entry Draft to the Nashville Predators in exchange for skater Nick Bonino and two 2020 draft picks: No. 37 and No. 70 overall. As a restricted free agent Kunin did not practice with his new team until he and the Predators had agreed to a contract extension eventually signing a two-year, $4.6 million contract with the team on January 6, 2021. Kunin's  started with two lower body injuries: the first sidelined him for four games at the start of February, while a more serious injury had him placed on the injured reserve on March 2. He returned to the lineup on March 27, picking up two assists in a 3–1 defeat of the Chicago Blackhawks. His return was accompanied by a hot streak, with Kunin scoring at least one point in five of his first six games back from injury, and the Predators went 14–6–1 during games he played. He also scored six goals in the last nine games of the regular season, including two in the Predators' 3–1 defeat of the Carolina Hurricanes on May 8, which allowed Nashville to clinch a berth in the 2021 Stanley Cup playoffs. The Predators faced the Hurricanes once again in the first round of playoffs, with Kunin scoring both the first and final goals in Game 4 to keep Nashville in the playoffs. Kunin's first goal came only 57 seconds into the game, while the game-winner came in double overtime. The Predators would lose the series, however, in overtime of Game 6. Kunin played in 38 games of the pandemic-shortened 2020–21 season for Nashville, scoring 10 goals and 19 points in the process.

On December 4, 2021, Kunin's 24th birthday, he recorded a Gordie Howe hat trick, the first for Nashville since Ryan Johansen three years prior, en route to a 4–3 overtime win against the Montreal Canadiens.

San Jose Sharks
On July 8, 2022, the Predators traded Kunin to the San Jose Sharks in exchange for forward John Leonard and a third-round selection in the 2023 NHL Entry Draft. As a restricted free agent, Kunin was later re-signed to a two-year, $5.5 million contract extension with the Sharks on July 18, 2022. On December 20, it was announced that Kunin would miss the remainder of the  due to a torn anterior cruciate ligament (ACL), which he sustained during a December 13 game against the Arizona Coyotes.

International play

Kunin has represented the United States internationally at a number of ice hockey competitions, beginning with the World U-17 Hockey Challenge in 2014. Serving as an alternate captain for the gold medal-winning team, Kunin scored two goals and recorded six points en route to the championships. The following year, he scored six goals and served as captain for the United States for another gold medal performance, this time at the 2015 IIHF World U18 Championships. He was passed over for the United States junior team at the 2016 IIHF World Junior Championship, but made the team the following year. Serving as the captain once more, Kunin took the team to his third consecutive international gold medal, becoming the third Badger to captain a World Juniors team to a championship, following Derek Stepan and Jake McCabe.

Kunin made his senior international debut at the 2019 IIHF World Championship in Slovakia, playing on a line alongside fellow NHL skaters Luke Glendening of the Detroit Red Wings and Frank Vatrano of the Florida Panthers. The United States failed to medal in the tournament, finishing in seventh place overall.

Personal life
Kunin's diabetes requires frequent management, particularly before games. In addition to checking his blood sugar level multiple times per day, Kunin takes shots of insulin before games, and will occasionally replenish his blood sugar with sips of Gatorade mid-game. Off the ice, he has done charity work with organizations that research juvenile diabetes. In 2021, he established the Luke Kunin T1D fund, which raises money for the Juvenile Diabetes Research Foundation.

Kunin is of Jewish heritage. During the COVID-19 pandemic lockdowns, he and his girlfriend adopted a French Bulldog named Rocco.

Career statistics

Regular season and playoffs

International

Awards and honors

See also
List of select Jewish ice hockey players

References

External links

1997 births
Living people
21st-century American Jews
AHCA Division I men's ice hockey All-Americans
American men's ice hockey centers
Ice hockey people from Missouri
Iowa Wild players
Jewish American sportspeople
Jewish ice hockey players
Minnesota Wild draft picks
Minnesota Wild players
Nashville Predators players
National Hockey League first-round draft picks
People from Chesterfield, Missouri
People with type 1 diabetes
San Jose Sharks players
Sportspeople from St. Louis County, Missouri
USA Hockey National Team Development Program players
Wisconsin Badgers men's ice hockey players